Panaspis seydeli, also known as the Seydel's snake-eyed skink, is a species of lidless skink, a lizard in the family Scincidae. The species is known from the Democratic Republic of the Congo and Zambia.

Etymology
The specific name, seydeli, is in honor of Belgian lepidopterist Charles Henri Victor Seydel (1873–1960).

Geographic range
P. seydeli is found in the southeastern Democratic Republic of the Congo and northern Zambia.

References

Further reading
de Witte G-F (1933). "Reptiles récoltés au Congo Belge par le Dr. H. Schouteden et par M. G.-F. de Witte". Annales du Musée royal du Congo Belge, Première Série 3: 53–100. (Ablepharus seydeli, new species, p. 78). (in French).
Greer AE (1974). "The genetic relationships of the Scincid lizard genus Leiolopisma and its relatives". Australian Journal of Zoology Supplementary Series 22 (31): 1–67. (Afroablepharus seydeli, new combination).
  (Panaspis seydeli).

Panaspis
Skinks of Africa
Reptiles of the Democratic Republic of the Congo
Reptiles of Zambia
Reptiles described in 1933
Taxa named by Gaston-François de Witte